Where's Your Cup? is an album by Henry Threadgill released on the Columbia label in 1997.  The album features seven of Threadgill's compositions performed by Threadgill's Make a Move band: Brandon Ross, Tony Cedras, Stomu Takeishi, and J.T. Lewis.

Reception
The Allmusic review by John Uhl awarded the album 4 stars, stating, "Even though Henry Threadgill is often considered "difficult to listen to," most blindfolded listeners would probably find themselves identifying any randomly selected 20-second segment of Where's Your Cup as something a little more mainstream... Such is the elusiveness of Threadgill's a-bit-of-everything approach to modern jazz, a style-collage sound he achieves here with a lot of help from his band, Make a Move... But give the credit of assembling these varied and sundry elements into a consistent product to Threadgill. Where's My Cup has its highly organized moments as well, which possess the same spaced-out mysteriousness as all the clamoring jam-out uproar".

Track listing
All compositions by Henry Threadgill
 "100 Year Old Game" - 10:54
 "Laughing Club" - 5:00
 "Where's Your Cup?" - 11:14
 "And This" - 13:40
 "Feels Like It" - 6:39
 "The Flew" - 9:50
 "Go to Far" - 8:56
Recorded at East Side Sound, New York City in August 1996

Personnel
Henry Threadgill - alto saxophone, flute
Brandon Ross - electric guitar, classical guitar
Tony Cedras - accordion, harmonium
Stomu Takeishi - 5-string fretless bass
J.T. Lewis - drums

References

1996 albums
Henry Threadgill albums
Albums produced by Bill Laswell
Columbia Records albums